Bossalinie is the second studio album by  American rapper C-Murder, released by No Limit Records, Priority Records, and EMI on March 9, 1999 as planned. It entered the Billboard 200 at number two of the week ending March 14, 1999, after selling  over 175,611 in its first week. It stayed on the chart for 11 weeks and was certified Gold by the RIAA. The album features production by Beats By the Pound and guest appearances by Daz Dillinger, Snoop Dogg, Nate Dogg, Kurupt, Goodie Mob and other No Limit Soldiers.

Controversy
C-Murder was charged by Bridgeport Records and/or Southfield Records with improper use of the musical composition "Flashlight" as an interpolated/sampled portion in "W Balls"  whereas the infringement has not been remedied as described in Infringing Compositions and/or Sound Recordings and/or Records.

Track listing

Chart positions

Weekly charts

Year-end charts

Certifications

See also
 List of number-one R&B albums of 1999 (U.S.)

References

C-Murder albums
1999 albums
Priority Records albums
No Limit Records albums
Albums produced by L.T. Hutton